Coorinja Vineyard or Coorinja Winery is an Australian winery at Coorinja (previously known as Seven Springs),  south of Toodyay, Western Australia, in the Central Western Australia wine zone. Sinclair left the partnership in 1890. Coorinja Vineyard Company was trademarked in 1893. It is one of the oldest extant vineyards in the state. The name is an Aboriginal word believed to mean "place of the seven springs".

The winery was described as "a fortified haven" by Michael Zekulich, former wine writer for The West Australian. Coorinja produces table and fortified wines including shiraz, grenache, cabernet-shiraz, port, sherry, muscat, liqueur muscat, ginger wine and marsala.

The Coorinja vineyard has been owned by the Wood family since 1919. The family also runs a cropping and sheep operation on the property.

See also

 Australian wine
 List of wineries in Western Australia
 Western Australian wine

References

Bibliography

External links

Heritage Council of WA – Places Database: Coorinja Winery
Where to next?: Coorinja—a winery with history – blog post about a visit to the winery

Agriculture companies established in the 19th century
Food and drink companies established in 1889
Wineries in Western Australia
Heritage places in Toodyay, Western Australia